Blood Red Roses is the 30th studio album by British singer-songwriter Rod Stewart. It was released on 28 September 2018 through Decca Records and Republic Records. It was produced by Stewart and Kevin Savigar. Covers on the album include versions of Jim McCann's "Grace", the Kingston Trio's "It Was a Very Good Year" and Hambone Willie Newbern's "Rollin' and Tumblin'".

Track listing

Commercial performance
Stewart first hit number one in UK with his third studio album Every Picture Tells A Story in 1971, and 47 years later, the album claimed the top spot with over 41,000 combined sales. In its second week it remained at number three with 12,921 sales.

Charts

Weekly charts

Year-end charts

Certifications

References

2018 albums
Republic Records albums
Rod Stewart albums
Albums produced by Rod Stewart